The Seminario Nuestra Señora Corredentora (English: Seminary of Our Lady Co-Redemptrix) is a Roman Catholic major seminary of the Society of Saint Pius X located in Moreno, Buenos Aires, Argentina.

History

List of rectors 
 Fr. Jean-Michel Faure, SSPX (1978–1988)
 Bishop Alfonso de Galarreta, SSPX (1988–?)
 Fr. Dominique Lagneau, SSPX (?–2003)
 Bishop Richard Williamson, SSPX (2003–2009)
 Bishop Alfonso de Galarreta, SSPX (2009–2012)
 Fr. Davide Pagliarani, SSPX

Notable people

Notable alumni

Notable faculty 
 Bishop Jean-Michel Faure, served as founding rector
 Bishop Alfonso de Galarreta, served as a professor and twice as rector
 Bishop Richard Williamson, served as rector

See also 
 List of Roman Catholic seminaries

External links 
 Seminary website

References 

Society of St. Pius X

Seminaries and theological colleges in Argentina
Catholic seminaries
Education in Buenos Aires